Clay Collard (born March 10, 1993) is an American professional mixed martial artist and boxer. A professional since 2011, he formerly competed for the UFC. He currently competes in the lightweight division of the Professional Fighters League.

Background
Collard grew up in Castle Dale, Utah. Collard started wrestling at the age of six, picking up boxing at the age of 11. Collard attended Emery High School, where he lettered in wrestling.

Mixed martial arts career

Early career
Collard took his first and only amateur mixed martial arts bout less than two weeks after his 18th birthday. He won the bout via 12-second knockout and subsequently turned professional to fight the next weekend. Collard competed solely in Utah regional circuit, amassing a 13–4 (1 NC) record before being signed to the UFC.

Ultimate Fighting Championship
Collard made his promotional debut on August 23, 2014 as a short notice replacement against Max Holloway at UFC Fight Night 49, replacing an injured Mirsad Bektic. Collard lost the fight via TKO in the third round.

Collard next faced Alex White on December 6, 2014 at UFC 181.  Collard won the fight via unanimous decision.

Collard faced Gabriel Benítez on June 13, 2015 at UFC 188. He lost the fight by unanimous decision.

Collard was expected to face Andre Fili on September 5, 2015 at UFC 191. However, Fili was forced out of the bout with injury and replaced by Tiago Trator. Collard lost the fight by split decision and was subsequently released from the promotion.

Collard was expected to headline LFA 75 against Arthur Estrázulas on September 6, 2019 but withdrew from the bout due to a short notice call from the UFC. After four years away from UFC, Collard returned to the promotion and was scheduled to face Devonte Smith on August 17, 2019 at UFC 241 replacing John Makdessi. However, on the fight week news surfaced that Collard withdrew from the fight due to an undisclosed reason and was replaced by promotional newcomer Khama Worthy. Following the ordeal, Collard was released from the promotion again.

Professional Fighters League 
In March 2020, Collard signed with Professional Fighters League and competes in the lightweight division. He was expected to participate in the season 2020 but due to COVID-19 pandemic the league cancelled the whole season. He is currently competing in the 2021 season.

2021 season 
Collard made his PFL debut against Anthony Pettis on April 23, 2021 at PFL 1. He won the bout via unanimous decision, out boxing Pettis throughout the bout.

Collard faced Joilton Lutterbach at PFL 4 on June 10, 2021. He won the bout via split decision.

Collard faced Raush Manfio in the semifinals of the Lightweight tournament on August 13, 2021 at PFL 7. Collard lost the bout via unanimous decision.

2022 season 
Collard faced Jeremy Stephens on April 20, 2022 at PFL 1. In a back and forth affair, Collard won the bout via unanimous decision.

Collard faced Alexander Martinez on June 17, 2022 at PFL 4. He lost the close bout via split decision.

Professional boxing career
Collard was initially training boxing only to improve his offensive striking skills for mixed martial arts. However, he needed money to fix his car so he opted to take a short-notice professional boxing match. He made his professional boxing debut in 2017, winning via split decision.

Championships and accomplishments
Showdown Fights
Showdown Fights Lightweight Championship (One time)
SteelFist Fight Night 
SteelFist Fight Night Lightweight Championship (One time)
One successful title defense
SteelFist Fight Night Welterweight Championship (One time)

Mixed martial arts record

|-
|Loss
|align=center|21–10 (1)
|Alexander Martinez
|Decision (split)
|PFL 4
|
|align=center|3
|align=center|5:00
|Atlanta, Georgia, United States
|
|-
|Win
|align=center|21–9 (1)
|Jeremy Stephens
|Decision (unanimous)
|PFL 1
|
|align=center|3
|align=center|5:00
|Arlington, Texas, United States
|
|-
|Loss
|align=center|20–9 (1)
|Raush Manfio
|Decision (unanimous)
|PFL 7 
|
|align=center|3
|align=center|5:00
|Hollywood, Florida, United States
|
|-
|Win
|align=center|20–8 (1)
|Joilton Lutterbach
|Decision (split)
|PFL 4 
|
|align=center|3
|align=center|5:00
|Atlantic City, New Jersey, United States
|
|-
|Win
|align=center|19–8 (1)
|Anthony Pettis
|Decision (unanimous)
|PFL 1 
|
|align=center|3
|align=center|5:00
|Atlantic City, New Jersey, United States
|
|-
| Win
|align=center| 18–8 (1)
|Randall Wallace 
|Decision (unanimous)
|Final Fight Championship 35: Egli vs. Holt
|
|align=center|3
|align=center|5:00
|Las Vegas, Nevada, United States
|
|-
| Win
|align=center| 17–8 (1)
|Lucas Montoya 
|TKO (punches)
|SteelFist Fight Night: March Madness
|
|align=center|1
|align=center|3:30
|Salt Lake City, Utah, United States
|
|-
| Loss
|align=center| 16–8 (1)
|Darrick Minner
|Submission (rear-naked choke)
|Final Fight Championship 33: Chub vs. Vrtačić
|
|align=center|1
|align=center|0:32
|Las Vegas, Nevada, United States
|
|-
| Win
|align=center| 16–7 (1)
|Carson Gregory
|Submission (triangle choke)
|SteelFist Fight Night 57 - Friday the 13th
|
|align=center|2
|align=center|3:07
|Salt Lake City, Utah, United States
|
|-
| Win
|align=center| 15–7 (1)
|Troy Dennison
| TKO (punches)
|SteelFist Fight Night 55: Opposites Attack
|
|align=center|1
|align=center|0:46
|Salt Lake City, Utah, United States
|
|-
| Loss
|align=center| 14–7 (1)
|Tiago Trator
| Decision (split)
|UFC 191
|
|align=center|3
|align=center|5:00
|Las Vegas, Nevada, United States
|
|-
| Loss
|align=center| 14–6 (1)
|Gabriel Benítez
| Decision (unanimous)
|UFC 188
|
|align=center|3
|align=center|5:00
|Mexico City, Mexico
|
|-
| Win
|align=center| 14–5 (1)
|Alex White
| Decision (unanimous)
|UFC 181
|
|align=center|3
|align=center|5:00
|Las Vegas, Nevada, United States
|
|-
| Loss
|align=center| 13–5 (1)
|Max Holloway
| TKO (punches)
|UFC Fight Night: Henderson vs. dos Anjos
|
|align=center|3
|align=center|3:47
|Tulsa, Oklahoma, United States
|
|-
| Win
|align=center| 13–4 (1)
|Nick Compton
| Decision (unanimous) 
|Showdown Fights 14: Heavyweight Collision
|
|align=center|3
|align=center|5:00
|Orem, Utah, United States
|
|-
| Win
|align=center| 12–4 (1)
|Jason Brenton
| Decision (unanimous)
|Showdown Fights 13: Lopez vs. Castillo
|
|align=center|3
|align=center|5:00
|Orem, Utah, United States
|
|-
| Win
|align=center| 11–4 (1)
|Justin Buchholz
| Decision (split)
|Showdown Fights 12: Buchholz vs. Collard 2
|
|align=center|5
|align=center|5:00
|Orem, Utah, United States
|
|-
| NC
|align=center| 10–4 (1)
|Jordan Clements
| No Contest
|Showdown Fights 10: Collard vs. Clements
|
|align=center|2
|align=center|2:08
|Orem, Utah, United States
|
|-
| Win
|align=center| 10–4
|Steve Sharp
| TKO (punches)
|Showdown Fights 9: Buchholz vs. Castillo
|
|align=center|2
|align=center|4:44
|Orem, Utah, United States
|
|-
| Loss
|align=center| 9–4
|Justin Buchholz
| Submission (guillotine choke)
|Showdown Fights 8: Burkman vs. Yager
|
|align=center|3
|align=center|1:35
|Orem, Utah, United States
|
|-
| Win
|align=center| 9–3
|Steve Walser
| TKO (punches)
|Showdown Fights 7: Uprising
|
|align=center|1
|align=center|0:44
|Orem, Utah, United States
|
|-
| Win
|align=center| 8–3
|Scott Casey
| Submission (rear-naked choke)
|Rocky Mountain Fight Championships 3
|
|align=center|1
|align=center|4:36
|Vernal, Utah, United States
|
|-
| Win
|align=center| 7–3
|Dustin Collins
| TKO (retirement)
|Rocky Mountain Fight Championships 2
|
|align=center|1
|align=center|5:00
|Vernal, Utah, United States
|
|-
| Win
|align=center| 6–3
|Luke Pierce
| TKO (punches)
|Flash Academy MMA: Fight Night Explosion
|
|align=center|1
|align=center|2:47
|Price, Utah, United States
|
|-
| Win
|align=center| 5–3
|Drayton Woods
| Submission (rear-naked choke)
|Crown Fighting Championships 4
|
|align=center|1
|align=center|3:07
|St. George, Utah, United States
|
|-
| Loss
|align=center| 4–3
|David Castillo
| Decision (unanimous)
|Jeremy Horn's Elite Fight Night 14
|
|align=center|3
|align=center|5:00
|Lehi, Utah, United States
|
|-
| Loss
|align=center| 4–2
|Oliver Parker
| Decision (unanimous)
|Moab Combat Sports: Red Rock Rumble 4
|
|align=center|3
|align=center|5:00
|Moab, Utah, United States
|
|-
| Win
|align=center| 4–1
|Kyle Herrera
| TKO (corner stoppage)
|Fight King: Fight for the Cops
|
|align=center|3
|align=center|1:54
|Salt Lake City, Utah, United States
|
|-
| Loss
|align=center| 3–1
|Jose Salgado
| Submission (rear-naked choke)
|Crown Fighting Championships 3
|
|align=center|2
|align=center|2:38
|St. George, Utah, United States
|
|-
| Win
|align=center| 3–0
|Kevin Hamby Jacobson
| TKO (punches)
|Flash Academy MMA: Mayhem & Motocross MMA Fight Night
|
|align=center|1
|align=center|1:10
|Price, Utah, United States
|
|-
| Win
|align=center| 2–0
|Kaifah Detoles
| TKO (punches)
|Fight Kings 7: No Mercy
|
|align=center|2
|align=center|2:02
|Vernal, Utah, United States
|
|-
| Win
|align=center| 1–0
|Daniel Ruiz
| TKO (punches)
|Moab Combat Sports: Red Rock Rumble 3
|
|align=center|1
|align=center|2:11
|Moab, Utah, United States
|
|-

Professional boxing record

See also
 List of current PFL fighters
 List of male mixed martial artists

References

External links
 Clay Collard at PFL
 
 
 

Living people
1993 births
American male boxers
Boxers from Utah
Super-middleweight boxers
American male mixed martial artists
Featherweight mixed martial artists
Mixed martial artists utilizing boxing
Mixed martial artists utilizing wrestling
People from Payson, Utah
People from Price, Utah
Mixed martial artists from Utah
Ultimate Fighting Championship male fighters